Cocoon Crash is the third studio album of the Belgian band K's Choice, released in 1998. Its singles were "Believe", "Everything for Free", and "If You're Not Scared". Musically, it is comparable to their second album, Paradise in Me, though with a generally lighter tone and subject matter.

Since its release, Cocoon Crash has sold more than 1,000,000 copies, and went platinum in Belgium and Netherlands. The album was produced by Gil Norton (Pixies, Counting Crows, Feeder).

Track listing

Personnel 
 Sam Bettens – vocals, guitar
 Gert Bettens – guitar, keyboards, vocals
 Jan Van Sichem Jr. – guitar on "Cocoon Crash"
 Eric Grossman – bass
 Bart Van Der Zeeuw – drums, percussion

Additional personnel 
Luis Jardin – percussion
Roy Spong – percussion
Mark Pythian – programming

Chart performance

References

External links
 [ Allmusic - K's Choice]

K's Choice albums
1998 albums
Albums produced by Gil Norton